Biclonuncaria parvuncus is a species of moth of the family Tortricidae. It is found in Minas Gerais, Brazil.

The wingspan is about 12 mm. The ground colour of the forewings is cream with a weak yellowish brown admixture. The hindwings are cream, slightly mixed with brownish apically.

Etymology
The species name refers to the size of the uncus and is derived from Latin parvus (meaning small).

References

Moths described in 2011
Polyorthini